Liljeström is a Swedish surname. Notable people with the surname include:

Inga Liljeström, Australian experimental vocalist and producer
Valdemar Liljeström (1902–1960), Finnish trade union activist and politician

Swedish-language surnames